The Ministry of Ecology and Natural Resources of Azerbaijan Republic is a governmental agency within the Cabinet of Azerbaijan in charge of regulation of the activities in the country relating to ecology, environmental protection and use of natural resources of Azerbaijan.

History
The Ministry of Ecology and Natural Resources of Azerbaijan was established on May 23, 2001 as per the Presidential Decree of President Heydar Aliyev No. 485 in accordance with structural reforms within the Azerbaijani government. The current activities of the ministry were being implemented, at times duplicated by several governmental agencies such as State Observation Committee for Ecology and Use of Natural Resources, Azermeshe union (responsible for forestry, State Committee of Geology and Mineral Resources, Azerbaliq State Concern (in charge of fishing industry), State Hydrometeorology Committee and their regulations were decentralized. The decree abolished all these agencies and centralized the governmental regulations and activities by replacing them with the new ministry.

According to a Decree №548, signed by President Heydar Aliyev on September 18, 2001, a "statute" linked with Ministry of Ecology and Natural Resources was approved.

Each year, on May 23, the staff of the Ministry celebrates their professional holiday. This day was declared as a non-working day for the staff due to a Decree which was signed by Ilham Aliyev and dates back to May 16, 2007.

Structure 
 The apparatus of the Ministry of Ecology and Natural Resources of the Republic of Azerbaijan (departments and sectors).
 Department of Environmental Protection.
 Department of Forestry Development.
 National Department of Environmental Monitoring.
 Department for the Conservation and Protection of Biodiversity in Waters.
 Department for Biodiversity Conservation and Development of Specially Protected Areas.
 National Hydrometeorological Department.
 Baku city department of ecology and natural resources.
 State Expert Department.
 Department of the Caspian Integrated Environmental Monitoring.
 Regional bodies and local departments of the Ministry of Ecology and Natural Resources of the Republic of Azerbaijan.

Organization
The ministry is headed by the minister with two deputy ministers. Main functions of the ministry are enhancing the knowledge base on natural resources, know-how, use and protection of resources, ensuring environmental protection, preservation of biological diversity of the resources, regulation of activities in using the biological resources in internal waters and Azerbaijani section of the Caspian Sea, their protection and preservation; enhancing the knowledge base on geology of the country, protection of mineral resources; preparation of regulations on usage, area enlargement, creation, protection of forests; ensuring environmental protection in populated places and so forth. The ministry also disseminates information on the environmental situation in the occupied territories of Azerbaijan, such as destruction of forestry in Fizuli Rayon of Azerbaijan.

In 2017, the majority of money from the state budget was spent on the development and expansion of forests. As it was planned, the Ministry spent approximately 13 billion AZN in this ecological sector. Currently, there are nearly 1,5 billion hectares of forests in Azerbaijan. Mostly, attention is paid to such regions as Barda, Beylagan, Yevlah, Zardab, Lankaran, Shemakha and Baku.

The ministry also strives to reduce the number of trees cut down.

State programs 
An evolvement of economy, an improvement of ecological conditions, an environmental protection, as well, as environmental problems’ solution, and finally, a custody of national resources are truly considered as main tasks of the Ministry of Ecology and National Resources. The Ministry included all these tasks in several state programs:

 The development concept "Azerbaijan 2020: a look into the future"
 "National Strategy for the Protection and Sustainable Use of Biodiversity in the Republic of Azerbaijan for 2017-2020"
 "Strategic road maps for the main sectors of the national economy and economy"
 "State Program for the Development of Official Statistics in the Republic of Azerbaijan for 2013-2017", approved by the Decree of the President of the Republic of Azerbaijan of December 21, 2012
 "State program for the development of the cadastral real estate system in the Republic of Azerbaijan, increasing the efficiency and use of land in 2016-2020"
 "National Action Plan for Government Promotion for 2016-2018"
 "Azerbaijan Youth Program 2017-2021"
 "State Program for the Development of Official Statistics in the Republic of Azerbaijan in 2018-2025"
 "State Program for the Development of Citrus Fruits in the Republic of Azerbaijan for 2018-2025"
 "The State Program for Development of Roughness in the Republic of Azerbaijan for 2018-2025"
 "State Program of Social and Economic Development of the Regions of the Republic of Azerbaijan for 2014-2018"
 "State Program of Viticulture Development in the Republic of Azerbaijan for 2012-2020"
 "Action Plan for Research and Mitigation of Consequences of Radon Danger in the Republic of Azerbaijan for 2014-2018"
 "State Program for the Development of Industry in the Republic of Azerbaijan for 2015-2020"
 "National program of social-economic development in the Republic of Azerbaijan (2003-2010)"
 "National Program for the Reproduction and Improvement of Forests in the Republic of Azerbaijan"
 "State program for the rational use of summer and winter pastures and rivers in the Republic of Azerbaijan (2004-2010)"
 "Program of development of hydrometeorology in the Republic of Azerbaijan (2004-2010)"
 "National Strategy and Action Plan for the Conservation and Sustainable Use of Biodiversity in the Republic of Azerbaijan (2006-2009)”
 "Comprehensive action plan for 2006-2010 on improving the environmental situation in the Republic of Azerbaijan"
 State program on the effective use and development of natural stone deposits on the Absheron peninsula (2003-2006)”
 State program of social and economic development of the regions of the Republic of Azerbaijan for 2004-2008”
 "State Program of Social and Economic Development of Regions of the Republic of Azerbaijan for 2009-2013"
 "State program of social and economic development of the city of Baku and its settlements in 2006-2008"
 "State program of socio-economic development of the city of Baku and its settlements in 2011-2013"
 "State Program for the Use of Alternative and Renewable Energy Sources in the Republic of Azerbaijan"
 "State Program for the Development of Tourism in the Republic of Azerbaijan for 2010-2014"
 "State Strategy for the Management of Hazardous Waste in the Republic of Azerbaijan" (2004-2010)"
 "State program of socio-economic development of Baku and its settlements in 2014-2016"
 "State Program for the Reliable Food Supply in the Republic of Azerbaijan for 2008-2015"
 "State Program on Poverty Reduction and Sustainable Development in the Republic of Azerbaijan for 2008-2015"
 "National Action Plan for the Government of the Open Government for 2012-2015"
 "National Action Plan for 2012-2015 on combating corruption"
 "State Program for the Development of Demography and Population in the Republic of Azerbaijan (2004-2008)"

See also
Cabinet of Azerbaijan
National Parks of Azerbaijan
State Reserves of Azerbaijan
List of protected areas of Azerbaijan

References

Ecology and Natural Resources
Environment of Azerbaijan
Azerbaijan
Azerbaijan